The Gear Rout was a Cornish insurrection of 1648 following the end of the English Civil War. It involved some 500 Cornish rebels who fought on the Royalist side against the Parliamentarian forces of Sir Hardress Waller.

Cornish forces had fought on the Royalist side in the defence of the Duchy against the New Model Army in the  Civil War and had perceived it as a war of national liberation against the English Parliament, which the Cornish ultimately lost.

After the English Civil War, taxes were increased to fund military installations but many in Cornwall rebelled against this and took to arms. Following the killing of 70 Cornish Royalists in Penzance on 16 May 1648, the people of Mullion sent 120 men, who marched to Goonhilly Downs and then to St Keverne and Mawgan, collecting 300 more foot soldiers and 40 horsemen. There was a battle against Parliamentarian forces under the control of Sir Hardress Waller which ultimately led to the defeat of the Cornish forces near Gear Camp, a nearby earthwork of the Celtic Iron Age that overlooked the Helford River.

See also

William Scawen
Braddock, Cornwall
Cornwall in the English Civil War

References

History of Cornwall
Cornish nationalism
Military history of Cornwall
1648 in England
Battles involving the Cornish
Conflicts in 1648
17th century in Cornwall